The Rural Municipality of Lost River No. 313 is a rural municipality (RM) in the Canadian province of Saskatchewan within Census Division No. 11 and  Division No. 5. Located in the central portion of the province, it is adjacent to the South Saskatchewan River.

History 
The RM of Lost River No. 313 incorporated as a rural municipality on December 11, 1911.

Geography

Communities and localities 
The following unincorporated communities are within the RM.

Localities
Allan Hills
South Allan

Allan Hills
The Allan Hills (51°40′0″N, 106°15′2″W) are a plateau south-east of Saskatoon and east of Blackstrap Lake mostly within the RM of Lost River. Parts of the plateau are also in the RM of Dundurn  No. 314, RM of Morris No. 312, and RM of McCraney No. 282. South Allan and Allan Hills are the only communities located on the plateau. The Allan Hills rise about 100 metres from the surrounding prairies and the highest point is 658 metres above sea level. The plateau is dotted with several small lakes, including Willie Lake, Cygnet Lake, Horseshoe Lake, and Bultel Lake. Arm River starts near Horseshoe Lake at the south-east corner of the hills and flows south into Last Mountain Lake. Highway 764, a gravel road, is the main road through the hills. It starts at Allan and heads south past South Allan to Allan Hills. From there, it heads west to Hanley.

In December 2015, Ducks Unlimited Canada (DUC) partnered with local cattlemen to help preserve 21 quarters of land (about 13,440 acres) in the hills. It was the largest conservation agreement in DUC's history.

Demographics 

Government 
The RM of Lost River No. 313 is governed by an elected municipal council and an appointed administrator that meets on the second Tuesday of every month. The reeve of the RM is Charles E. Smith while its administrator is Christine Dyck. The RM's office is located in Allan.

See also 
 List of rural municipalities in Saskatchewan

References 

Lost River

Hills of Saskatchewan
Division No. 11, Saskatchewan